Nazarbayev or Nazarbaev is the masculine form of a Kazakh surname which literally means "gazed rich man". The feminine form of the surname is written as Nazarbayeva.

The people with the surname include:

 Nursultan Nazarbayev (born 1940), former President of Kazakhstan
 Sara Nazarbayeva (born 1941), wife of Nursultan and former First Lady of Kazakhstan
 Dariga Nazarbayeva (born 1964), Kazakh politician
 Aisultan Nazarbayev (1990−2020), Kazakh football player
 Aliya Nazarbayeva (born 1980), Kazakh businesswoman

References

Kazakh-language surnames